This is a list of women writers who were born in Bulgaria or whose writings are closely associated with that country.

A
Elena Alexieva (born 1975), poet, short story writer, novelist, translator

B
Elisaveta Bagriana (1893–1991), early poet, magazine editor, poems translated into English
Miryana Ivanova Basheva (1947–2020), poet
Tania Boteva-Malo (born 1950), French-language writer, novelist, living in Brussels
Iana Boukova (born 1968) Bulgarian poet, novelist, playwright and literary translator

D
Svetla Damyanovska, contemporary poet, novelist
Alexenia Dimitrova (born 1960s), investigative journalist
Blaga Dimitrova (1922–2003), poet, Vice-President of Bulgaria
Kristin Dimitrova (born 1963), widely published poet, short story writer, editor, columnist, translator 
Theodora Dimova (born 1960), novelist, playwright
Guerguina Dvoretzka (born 1954), poet, novelist, journalist
Emiliya Dvoryanova (born 1958), successful novelist

E
Zdravka Evtimova (born 1959), short story writer, novelist

F
Lyudmila Filipova (born 1977), best selling novelist, journalist

G
Dora Gabe (1886–1983), poet, magazine editor, columnist, travel writer, children's writer, translator

I
Mirela Ivanova (born 1962), acclaimed poet, essayist, critic, poems translated into English

K
Ekaterina Karabasheva (born 1989), poet, short story writer, works translated into English
Anna Karima (1871–1949), translator, editor, journalist, women's rights activist
Kapka Kassabova (born 1973), poet, essayist, writing in English
Julia Kristeva (born 1941), philosopher, novelist, essayist, critic, feminist, living in France

L
Lora Lazar, pen-name of a Bulgarian crime writer
Ruzha Lazarova (born 1968), novelist, short story writer, writing in Bulgarian and French

M
Aksinia Mihaylova (born 1963), widely translated poet, journal editor, translator, writing in Bulgarian and French
Leda Mileva (1920–2013), prominent poet, children's writer
Aleksandra Monedzhikova (1889–1959), geographer, author, travel writer

N
Milena Nikolova (born 1984), poet, prose writer

O
Nina Ognianova, investigative journalist since 2007, essayist

P
Milkana Palavurova (born 1974), yoga teacher, writings on yoga
Maria Popova (born 1984), writes cultural articles on her blog BrainPickings.org, now lives in New York

R
Valentina Dimitrova Radinska (born 1951), poet, editor

S
Julia Spiridonova–Yulka (born 1972), short story writer, novelist, children's writer
Albena Stambolova (born 1957), psychologist, columnist, novelist
Tea Sugareva (born 1989), theatre director, poet

V
Svetla Vassileva (born 1964), non-fiction writer, columnist, blogger

Y
Yana Yazova, pen name of Lyuba Todorova Gancheva (1912–1974), poet, historical novelist
Ekaterina Petrova Yosifova (1941–2022), journalist, essayist, poet

See also
List of women writers
List of Bulgarian writers

References

-
Bulgarian women writers, List of
Writers
Writers, women